This article is about the particular significance of the year 1958 to Wales and its people.

Incumbents

Minister of Welsh Affairs – Henry Brooke
Archbishop of Wales – Edwin Morris, Bishop of Monmouth
Archdruid of the National Eisteddfod of Wales – William Morris

Events
18 January – Nigel Birch resigns as Economic Secretary to the Treasury.
5 February – The Wales national football team qualifies for this summer's World Cup in Sweden under the management of Jimmy Murphy.
6 February – Manchester United F.C., the English league champions where Jimmy Murphy is also assistant manager, are involved in a plane crash in Munich, West Germany, on the journey home from a European Cup tie in Yugoslavia. Seven United players are among the 21 people who die, but among the survivors is Swansea-born winger Kenny Morgans.
25 February – The Campaign for Nuclear Disarmament is launched by Bertrand Russell.
2 April – Accidental discovery of the Caernarfon Mithraeum.
6 May – Murderer Vivian Teed is hanged by Robert Leslie Stewart in Swansea Prison, the last hanging to take place in Wales.
19 June – Wales are knocked out of the World Cup in the quarter-finals, losing to Brazil.
26 July – At the Empire Games in Cardiff, Elizabeth II announces that her son, The Prince Charles (now Charles III), is to be created Prince of Wales.
6 August – Daniel Granville West becomes the first Welsh life peer.
18 August
 Accidental discovery of Brymbo Man (c.2000 BCE).
 Regional postage stamps of Great Britain are first issued.
24 October – Huw T. Edwards announces his resignation from the chair of the  Council for Wales and Monmouthshire in protest at the decision to flood the Tryweryn valley.
13 December – New road bridge across the River Conway at Conway supersedes Telford's suspension bridge.
Thomas Parry becomes Principal of University of Wales, Aberystwyth.

Arts and literature

Awards

National Eisteddfod of Wales (held in Ebbw Vale)
National Eisteddfod of Wales: Chair – T. Llew Jones, "Caerllion ar Wysg"
National Eisteddfod of Wales: Crown – Llywelyn Jones, "Cymod"
National Eisteddfod of Wales: Prose Medal – Edward Cynolwyn Pugh, "Hunangofiant: Ei Ffanffer ei Hun"

New books

English language
Tom Beynon – Howell Harris, Reformer and Soldier
Brenda Chamberlain – The Green Heart
Paul Ferris – A Changed Man
Cyril Fox – Pattern and purpose: a study of early Celtic art in Britain
Peter George – Red Alert
Emyr Humphreys – A Toy Epic 
Bertrand Russell – Understanding History and Other Essays
Raymond Williams – Culture and Society

Welsh language
Aneirin Talfan Davies – Englynion a Chywyddau
Islwyn Ffowc Elis – Blas y Cynfyd
Bobi Jones – Nid yw Dwr yn Plygu
D. Gwenallt Jones – Cofiant Idwal Jones
T. Llew Jones – Trysor Plas y wernen and Merched y môr a chwedlau eraill
Ernest Llwyd Williams – Crwydro Sir Benfro

New drama
George Fisher – Y Ferch a'r Dewin
John Gwilym Jones – Lle Mynno'r Gwynt
Saunders Lewis – Brad

Music
Daniel Jones – The Country Beyond the Stars (cantata)
Ian Parrott – Cor Anglais concerto

Film
Richard Burton stars in the film version of Look Back in Anger.
Ronald Lewis co-stars in The Wind Cannot Read.
Release of The Inn of the Sixth Happiness, with location scenes (representing China) filmed around Nantmor near Beddgelert.

Broadcasting
July – In order to broadcast the British Empire and Commonwealth Games from Cardiff, a broadcasting centre is set up on the bank of the River Taff, near Cardiff Arms Park.

Welsh-language television
Commercial TV becomes available in Wales, broadcasting some Welsh-language programmes, such as Amser Te.

English-language television
30 November – During the live broadcast of the Armchair Theatre play Underground on the ITV network, actor Gareth Jones has a fatal heart attack between two of his scenes.
Gwlad y Gân / Land of Song, with Ivor Emmanuel and Sian Hopkins

Sports
British Empire and Commonwealth Games (held in Cardiff):
Wales' single gold medal is won by Howard Winstone in the bantamweight boxing competition.
Silver medals are won by: John Merriman (6 miles), Malcolm Collins (featherweight boxing), and Robert Higgins (light-heavyweight boxing).
Due to being on National Service in the British Army, Swansea fighter Brian Curvis competes in the games for England, winning a bronze medal at welterweight.
Football – Wales reaches the quarter-finals of the World Cup, being knocked out by a goal from Pelé.
Gymnastics – Margaret Neale of Cardiff is the British Women's Champion for the second year running.
BBC Wales Sports Personality of the Year – Howard Winstone

Births
4 January – Gary Jones, actor
1 March – Ian Love, footballer
2 March – Ian Woosnam, golfer
8 March – Wayne Hughes, footballer
16 April – Caryl Parry Jones, singer
30 April – Claire Curtis-Thomas, politician
8 May – Aneirin Hughes, actor
17 May – Paul Whitehouse, actor, writer and comedian
3 July – Siân Lloyd, television presenter
18 July – Chris Ruane, politician
19 July – Angharad Tomos, author
3 September (in Totnes) – Tamsin Dunwoody, politician
16 September – Neville Southall, footballer
4 October – Anneka Rice, television presenter
24 November – Robin Llywelyn, novelist
date unknown – Cerith Wyn Evans, conceptual artist

Deaths
31 January – Edgar Long, Wales international rugby player
January/February – William Beynon, Canadian oral historian, of Welsh parentage, 69/70
6 February – Charles Langbridge Morgan, novelist and dramatist, 64
11 February – Ernest Jones, psychoanalyst, 79
18 February – Rhisiart Morgan Davies, physicist, 55
2 April – Tudor Davies, singer, 65
3 April – John Strand-Jones, Wales international rugby union player
19 April – Billy Meredith, footballer, 83
28 April – Joseph Booth, rugby player, 84/85
18 July – Ernie Jenkins, Wales international rugby player, 77
20 July (in London) – Margaret Haig Thomas, Viscountess Rhondda, political campaigner and businesswoman, 75
29 August – Harry Beadles, international footballer, 60
25 September – Henry Arthur Evans, politician, 60
9 October – Sven Hansen, ship-owner, 82
30 October – Tommy Vile, Welsh international rugby player, 76
4 November – Dick Jones, Welsh international rugby player, 78
30 November (in Manchester) – Gareth Jones, actor, 33
November – Ivor Lewis, Welsh-Canadian artist, 76
13 December – Rose Davies, teacher, feminist, and labour activist, 66
date unknown – Evan Edwards, footballer, 59/60

See also
1958 in Northern Ireland

References

 
Wales